Rui José Capela Batista (Beja, May 6, 1969) is a former Portuguese football player and coach. He is currently a coach for Al-Khor of Qatar.

Biography 
Rui Capela Batista was born on May 6, 1969, in Beja. As a football player, he played for several clubs until he ended his career at the age of 32 due to injury. He was an international player for the Portugal national team in the U16 and U18 categories and played under the guidance of Carlos Queiroz in the national team.

After retiring from his career as a football player, Rui Capela Batista went on to work as technical director in the Algarve region (Quarteirense, Grupo Desportivo da Lagoa, Portimonense SC, Esperança de Lagos) until 2010.

Rui Capela Batista finished his first level degree as a coach at the National School of Physical Education in Paraguay in 2011, where he joined Club Atlético 3 de Febrero of the Second League as technical director and became champion in 2013. He also coached the youth team where he won his first championship as head coach.

In 2013/2014, Rui Capela Batista emigrated to Bangladesh to train Mohammedan SC where he won the Bangladesh Federation Cup.

In 2014/2015, he joined Wydad AC, of Morocco, and returned to the role of technical director where he was national champion.

On February 15, 2015, Rui Capela Batista joined Lithuanian side FK Kruoja Pakruojis as head coach. After leaving the club, he went on to complete his level 4 UEFA Pro License.

In August 2015, he signed for Qatar's Al-Khor where he started by training the B team and now manages the U23 team. He renewed his contract with the club in May 2016. In February 2019, Rui Capela Batista was promoted to assistant manager to the main team at Al-Khor.

In the 2019/20 season, Rui Capela Batista aggregated the functions of managers for the U23 and U19 team. In May 2020, Al-Khor U19 were crowned national champions.

On February 25, 2023, during football season 2022/2023 Rui Capela Batista joined Czech club 1. SC Znojmo FK as a head coach.

Titles

Club Atlético 3 de Febrero 

 2011 – Winner – U18 Championship
 2013 – Winner – Segunda División

Mohammedan SC 

 2014 – Winner – Bangladesh Federation Cup

Wydad Athletic Club 

 2015 – Winner – Botola (Moroccan League)

Al-Khor 

 2019/20 – Winner – Qatar U19 Championship

References 

1969 births
Living people
Portuguese footballers
Al-Khor SC
Association footballers not categorized by position